Gaetano Belvederi (1821-1872) was an Italian painter, active in Bologna.

He studied at the Collegio Venturoli. Among his works are:
 The Funeral Procession (convoglio funebre) di Zerbino
 Flight of Angelica Galeazzo Marescotti
 Italian mothers in the field after the Battle of San Martino
 Rocco Sileo brings poison to his imprisoned Son 
 A Poor Woman Takes her Children to Fight for the Nation
 A Law lesson of the Pannier (dalla bigoncia) di San Stefano in Bologna 
 Portrait of Napoleon 3rd for the Marchese Luigi Pizzardi still at Palazzo Legnani Pizzardo, Bologna

References

Bibliography
 

19th-century Italian painters
Italian male painters
Painters from Bologna
1821 births
1872 deaths
19th-century Italian male artists